Johann Georg Rosenhain (10 June 1816 in Königsberg – 14 March 1887  Berlin) was a German mathematician who introduced theta characteristics.

Rosenhain was born to a Jewish family, to Nathan Rosenhain and Röschen Joseph.

References

Rosenhain, Johann Georg Complete Dictionary of Scientific Biography. 2008

19th-century German mathematicians
19th-century German Jews
Scientists from Königsberg
1816 births
1887 deaths